The Kenya Certificate of Primary Education (KCPE) is a certificate awarded to students after completing the approved eight-year course in primary education in Kenya. The examination is supervised by the Kenya National Examination Council (KNEC), an examining body in Kenya under the Ministry of Education. The same body also conducts and regulates the Kenya Certificate of Secondary Education (KCSE), a certificate awarded to students after completing secondary education. KCPE and KCSE were both started in 1985 when the 8-4-4 system of education was introduced in Kenya.

Examination 
The subjects examined are Mathematics, English, Kiswahili, Social Studies and Religious Education (Christian/Islamic/Hindu) and Science. English and Kiswahili consist of two parts, for English there is Grammar and Composition, and for Kiswahili, there is Lugha and Insha. Social Studies includes a bit of Kenyan History, Civic education, current County system of government as well as all the Religious Studies. Deaf or hard of hearing students may choose to be tested in Kenyan Sign Language instead of Kiswahili. Each subject is worth a maximum of 100 marks. Each candidate is therefore able to earn a maximum of 500 marks. Usually the exam time runs from the last week of October and takes three days. In 2016, the exams were held In October. Results are then announced by the Minister for Education sometime in November.
Efforts are ongoing to scrap the KCPE exam.

References

External links 
 Kenya National Examination Council

Education in Kenya
Primary school qualifications
Primary education